A list of notable Surinamese writers:

A 
 Clark Accord
 Karin Amatmoekrim
 Bernardo Ashetu

B 
 Aphra Behn
 Bhai (James Ramlall)

C 
 Cándani

D 
 Thea Doelwijt
 Eugène Drenthe

F 
 Hans Faverey

G 
 Chitra Gajadin
 Trudi Guda

H 
 Ed Hart
 Albert Helman

K 
 Anton de Kom
 Ismene Krishnadath

L 
 Tessa Leuwsha
 Noni Lichtveld

M 
 Cynthia McLeod

N 
 David Nassy

P 
 André Pakosie
 Pim de la Parra
 Hugo Pos

R 
 Anil Ramdas
Hélène Ramjiawan
 Sophie Redmond
 Astrid Roemer

S 
 Johanna Schouten-Elsenhout
 Shrinivási
 Marylin Simons
 Ronald Snijders
 John Gabriel Stedman
 Sharona Lieuw- On ( Shachem Lieuw)

T 
 Trefossa (Henny de Ziel)

V 
 Vene (Ronald Venetiaan)
 Wim Bos Verschuur
 Bea Vianen

W 

 Joanna Werners

References

External links
 Surinamese literature at Digital Library for Dutch Literature

Writers
Suriname